The 2012 Dayton Flyers football team represented the University of Dayton in the 2012 NCAA Division I FCS football season. They were led by fifth-year head coach Rick Chamberlin and played their home games at Welcome Stadium. They are a member of the Pioneer Football League. They finished the season 6–5, 5–3 in Pioneer League play to finish in a tie for fourth place.

Schedule

References

Dayton
Dayton Flyers football seasons
Dayton Flyers football